The following is a list of notable deaths in May 2006.

Entries for each day are listed alphabetically by surname. A typical entry lists information in the following sequence:
 Name, age, country of citizenship at birth, subsequent country of citizenship (if applicable), reason for notability, cause of death (if known), and reference.

May 2006

1 

Jay Presson Allen, 84, American screenwriter, stroke.
Wilfrid Butt, 83, English biochemist and reproductive endocrinologist. 
Ed Casey, 73, Australian politician, former Queensland Labor Party leader, stroke.
George F. Haines, 82, American Olympic swimming coach, complications from a stroke.
Betsy Jones-Moreland, 76, American film and television actress, cancer.
Rob Lacey, 43, British stage actor and award-winning Christian author, bladder cancer.
Rauno Lehtinen, 74, Finnish composer.
Johnny Paris, 65, American saxophonist (Johnny & the Hurricanes).
Bruce Peterson, 72, American test pilot and engineer, known for surviving the crash of the M2-F2 and inspiring the TV-series The Six Million Dollar Man.
Raúl Francisco Primatesta, 87, Argentine retired Cardinal Archbishop of Córdoba, Argentina. Slim Aarons Gets ripped off the paper photo

2 

Clive Burgess, 55, Welsh rugby union player.
Joseph Lewis Clark, 57, American convicted murderer, executed in Ohio.
Boyd Coffie, 68, American baseball player and manager, cancer.
Luigi Griffanti, 89, Italian footballer, goalkeeper of ACF Fiorentina in the 1940s.
Sam Mokuahi, Jr. aka "Sammy Steamboat", 71, American Hawaiian professional wrestler, complications from Alzheimer's disease.
Louis Rukeyser, 73, American business and economics expert, multiple myeloma.
Juan Ramón Salgado, 45, Honduran congressional deputy, gunshot wounds.

3 

Karel Appel, 85, Dutch COBRA painter.
Rosita Fernandez, 88, American singer.
Franco Lavoratori, 65, Italian water polo player, Olympic Champion (1960).
Pramod Mahajan, 56, Indian politician, general secretary of Bharatiya Janata Party, gunshot wounds.
Howard Thomas Markey, 85, American federal judge and U.S. Air Force major general, first chief judge of the United States Court of Appeals for the Federal Circuit.
Earl Woods, 74, American US Army infantry officer, father and former coach of U.S. golfer Tiger Woods, prostate cancer.

4 

Alejandra Boero, 88, Argentine theater actress, director and teacher, pulmonary hypertension.
Jim Delsing, 80, American Major League Baseball player, cancer.
Arthur B. Metzner, 79, Canadian chemical engineer.
Michael Taliferro, 45, American actor and football player, stroke.

5 

Naushad Ali, 86, Indian musician.
Zoe Dumitrescu-Bușulenga, 85, Romanian comparatist and essayist.
George Roche III, 70, American former President of Hillsdale College, probable heart attack.
Atıf Yılmaz, 80, Turkish film director, screenwriter and producer, cancer.

6 

Lillian Asplund, 99, last American survivor of the  sinking, died in sleep.
Konstantin Beskov, 85, Soviet and Russian footballer and manager.
Ruth Bachhuber Doyle, 89, American politician and educator.
Shigeru Kayano, 79, Japanese Ainu activist.
Grant McLennan, 48, Australian lead singer of The Go-Betweens, suspected heart attack.
Sir Anthony Morton, 82, British admiral.
Flight Lieutenant Sarah-Jayne Mulvihill, 32, first British servicewoman to be killed in action in Iraq.
František Peřina, 95, Czechoslovak fighter pilot who served in the British Royal Air Force during World War II.
Pattabhi Rama Reddy, 87, Indian moviemaker, complications from a prolonged illness.
Lorne Saxberg, 48, Canadian television journalist, Canadian Broadcasting Corporation (CBC) broadcaster.
Sister Rose Thering, 85, American Roman Catholic nun and professor at Seton Hall University.

7 

 Steve Bender, 59, German record producer and member of Dschinghis Khan.
 Duncan Inglis Cameron, 78, Scottish university administrator.
Richard Carleton, 62, Australian television journalist (60 Minutes), heart attack.
Joan C. Edwards, 87, American philanthropist, liver cancer.
Stella Sigcau, 69, South African Public Works Minister, heart-related problems.
Jocelyn Simon, Baron Simon of Glaisdale, 95, United Kingdom minister and Lord of Appeal in Ordinary.
Machiko Soga, 68, Japanese voice actress and actress and tokusatsu legend (Kyoryu Sentai Zyuranger, Mighty Morphin' Power Rangers, etc.), pancreatic cancer.

8 

Lovana Jones, 68, American Assistant Majority Leader in the Illinois House of Representatives, represented the 26th District since 1987, undisclosed causes.
John Kimbrough, 87, American football player (College Hall of Fame with Texas A&M) and state legislator, pneumonia.
George Lutz, 59, American owner of the Amityville Horror house.
Patrick Pule "Ace" Ntsoelengoe, 50, South African soccer player with the Minnesota Kicks and Kaizer Chiefs, unknown causes.
Barbara Schwartz, 58, American painter.

9 

Adrian Bennett, 73, Australian politician, MHR for Division of Swan (1969–1975).
Corey Engen, 90, Norwegian-born captain of the U.S. Nordic skiing team at the 1948 Winter Olympics, complications of pneumonia.
Jerzy Ficowski, 81, Polish poet, writer and translator.
Pietro Garinei, 87, Italian playwright and lyricist of "Arrivederci Roma" and other songs.
Edouard Jaguer, French poet and art critic.
Tony Ward, 82, Australian actor and journalist, cancer.

10 

Val Guest, 94, British film writer and director (The Quatermass Xperiment, Casino Royale).
Marie Hartley, 100, British author and illustrator.
John Hicks, 64, American jazz pianist/composer.
James Keogh, 89, American former executive editor of Time and speechwriter for US President Richard Nixon.
Georgy Korniyenko, 81, Russian diplomat and deputy to Foreign Minister Andrei Gromyko.
A.M. Rosenthal, 84, Canadian-born Executive Editor of The New York Times for 17 years, stroke.
Soraya, 37, Colombian-American songwriter, guitarist, arranger, record producer, and singer, breast cancer.
Aleksandr Zinovyev, 83, Russian logician, sociologist and writer, brain cancer.

11 

Yossi Banai, 74, Israeli singer and actor, cancer.
Sir Frank Mills, 82, British diplomat, High Commissioner to Ghana and Bangladesh.
Byron Morrow, 95, American TV and film character actor.
Michael O'Leary, 70, Irish politician and barrister, former leader of the Irish Labour Party, drowned in a swimming pool.
Floyd Patterson, 71, American former boxing heavyweight champion, Alzheimer's disease and prostate cancer.
Ferdinando Tacconi, 83, Italian comics artist.
Frankie Thomas, 85, American actor (Tom Corbett, Space Cadet), stroke.

12 

Ted Berkman, 92, American author, scriptwriter (Bedtime for Bonzo).
Hussein Maziq, 88, Libyan politician, former prime minister & foreign minister of Libya.
Gillespie V. "Sonny" Montgomery, 85, American politician, former U.S. representative from Mississippi.
Arthur Porges, 90, American science fiction and fantasy writer.

13 

Joan Diener, 76, American actress/soprano (Man of La Mancha), complications of cancer.
Rick Farley, 53, Australian National Farmers' Federation Chief Executive for eight years.
Ryan Francis, 19, American college basketball player, freshman point guard for the University of Southern California basketball team, homicide.
Fernando Inchauste, 75, Bolivian Olympian.
Jaroslav Pelikan, 82, American historian of Christianity, winner of the Kluge Prize in the Human Sciences, lung cancer.
Östen Sjöstrand, 80, Swedish poet, translator and member of the Swedish Academy.
Peter Viereck, 89, American historian and Pulitzer Prize-winning poet.
Johnnie Wilder, Jr., 56, American R&B musician, founder of Heatwave ("Boogie Nights", "Always and Forever").

14 

Lew Anderson, 84, American bandleader, played Clarabell the Clown on The Howdy Doody Show, prostate cancer. 
James Botten, 67, South African international test cricketer, complications after colon operations.
Steve Cooper, 47, American rock singer for Juggernaut and S.A. Slayer.
William Ginsberg, 75, American professor of environmental law at Hofstra University and former New York City commissioner of parks and recreation.
Reza Hassanzadeh, 33, Iranian professional soccer player with Teraktor Sazi F.C., injuries from car accident.
Stanley Kunitz, 100, American Pulitzer Prize-winning poet and former US poet laureate.
Jim Lemon, 78, American Major League Baseball player, cancer.
Paul Marco, c. 81, American film actor (Plan 9 from Outer Space).
Bruce Merrifield, 84, American Nobel Prize-winning chemist. 
Günther Nenning, 84, Austrian journalist, author and political activist.
Eva Norvind, Norwegian-born Mexican writer and actress, drowning accident.

15 

Joyce Ballantyne, 88, American artist best known for creating the "Coppertone Girl" ad, heart attack.
George Blackburn, 93, American football player, head football coach at University of Virginia (1965–1970).
George Crile III, 61, American journalist, CBS News producer, pancreatic cancer. 
Eberhard Esche, 73, German actor.
Chic Hecht, 77, American politician, former Republican Senator for Nevada, prostate cancer.
Judith Moore, 66, American author (Fat Girl - A True Story).
Cheikha Rimitti, 83, Algerian singer, heart attack.
David Sharp, 34, British mountaineer.
Bill Strode, 69, American Pulitzer Prize–winning photographer, cancer.

16 

Clare Boylan, 58, Irish author of 12 books including 7 novels, ovarian cancer.
Beryl Evans, 84, Australian politician, NSW MLC (1984–1995).
Anthony Murray, 47, New Zealand rugby league player.
Jorge Porcel, 69, Argentine actor and comedian, following gall bladder surgery.
Dan Ross, 49, American former NFL football player (Cincinnati Bengals), suspected heart attack.
Takahiro Tamura, 77, Japanese movie and television actor, cerebral infarction.

17 

Cy Feuer, 95, American Broadway producer and writer (Guys and Dolls).
Eric Forth, 61, British Conservative Member of Parliament and former government minister, bone cancer.
Nichola Goddard, 26, Canadian soldier, Canadian Forces, first female since WWII to be killed in combat.
Dan Q. Kennis, 86, American B movie producer.
John Marsden, 64, Australian lawyer and civil liberties activist, cancer.
Sir John Miller, 87, British equestrian and courtier, Crown Equerry to the Queen (1961–1987).
Daniel Owino Misiani, 66, Tanzanian Benga musician, car accident.
Mieczysław Nowak, 69, Polish weightlifter, 1964 Olympic medalist.
Mustafa Yücel Özbilgin, 63, Turkish prominent judge sitting in Turkey's highest court, shot dead.
Ramesh Parekh, 65, Indian poet.
Lawrence "Ramrod" Shurtliff, 61, American music executive, longtime crew member of the Grateful Dead, lung cancer.

18 

 James Andrew "Andy" Capps, 37, American former drummer (Built to Spill).
Jaan Eilart, 73, Estonian biogeographer.
Stephen Fleet, 69, British researcher in mineral sciences and Former Registrary, Deputy Vice-Chancellor and Master of Downing College, Cambridge.
George M. Foster, 92, American anthropologist.
Morris Glushien, 96, American lawyer, general counsel for the International Ladies' Garment Workers' Union.
Hans Horrevoets, 32, Dutch sailor, swept overboard while competing in Volvo Ocean Race.
Stan Jones, 91, British Olympic runner.
Maksim Kahan, 88, Israeli Olympic shooter.
Andrew Martinez, 33, American activist, the "Naked Guy" at the University of California, Berkeley, apparent suicide.
Vitor Negrete, 38, Brazilian mountaineer, died after reaching the peak of Mount Everest without supplementary oxygen.
Michael O'Riordan, 88, Irish chairman of the Communist Party of Ireland and International Brigades veteran.
Kiyan Prince, 15, British youth team player with English football team Queens Park Rangers, stabbed to death.
Robert Reid, 81, American chemical engineer.
Gilbert Sorrentino, 77, American novelist.

19 

Yitzhak Ben Aharon, 99, Israeli left-wing politician, founder of the Israeli Labor Party.
Edward R. Becker, 73, American former chief judge of the United States Court of Appeals for the Third Circuit.
Peter Bryant, 82, British television producer.
Freddie Garrity, 69, English lead singer of Freddie and the Dreamers, 1960s pop band, heart disease.
Alan Sapper, 75, British trade unionist.

20 

JoAnna Lund, 61, American cookbook author, cancer.
Bobby Jack Fowler, 66, American rapist and suspected serial killer.
Les Olive, 78, English Assistant Secretary of Manchester United at time of Munich air disaster, prostate cancer.
Andy Radford, 62, British Anglican bishop, Bishop of Taunton, brain tumour.
Cherd Songsri, 75, Thai film director, cancer.
Annis Stukus, 91, Canadian football player and ice hockey general manager, member of Canada's Sports Hall of Fame for his contributions to the Canadian Football League and ice hockey.
Tommy Watt, 80, British jazz bandleader.

21 
Katherine Dunham, 96, American dancer and choreographer.
Richard McIlkenny, 73, British member of the Birmingham Six, cancer.
Sherman Skolnick, 75, American Illinois anti-corruption activist, heart attack.
Inger Louise Valle, 84, Norwegian politician, Minister of Justice (1973–1979).
Billy Walker, 77, American country music performer and member of the Grand Ole Opry, traffic accident.

22 
Spencer Clark, 19, American NASCAR Busch Series driver, road accident.
Heather Crowe, 61, Canadian anti-smoking activist, lung cancer.
Hamza El Din, 76, Nubian Egyptian oud player.
Jack Fallon, 90, Canadian-born British jazz double bassist.
Lee Jong-wook, 61, Korean Director-General of the World Health Organization, brain thrombus.
Lilia Prado, 78, Mexican actress, multiple organ failure.

23 

Philippe Amaury, 66, French media owner, cancer.
Clifford Antone, 56, American Austin blues club owner, heart attack.
Lloyd Bentsen, 85, American Vice-Presidential candidate, Senator, and Treasury Secretary under Clinton.
James W. Carey, 71, American professor of journalism at Columbia University, author.
Ray Cale, 83, Welsh rugby player, dual international for Wales in rugby union and rugby league.
Ian Copeland, 57, American music promoter and agent, older brother of Stewart Copeland of The Police, melanoma. 
Bracha Eden, 78, Israeli pianist, brain hemorrhage.
Kazimierz Górski, 85, Polish former coach of Poland national football team, cancer.
Mary Margaret Smith, 112, American supercentenarian, Ohio's oldest person.
Jim Trimble, 87, American Philadelphia Eagles coach 1952–55, emphysema.

24 

Eric Bedser, 87, English cricketer for Surrey, and elder twin brother of Sir Alec Bedser.
Henry Bumstead, 91, American Academy Awards-winning art director (To Kill a Mockingbird, The Sting), prostate cancer.
Robert Giaimo, 86, American Congressman for Connecticut 3rd District (1959−1981), lung ailments.
Fritz Klein, 73, Austrian-born psychiatrist and researcher.
Anderson Mazoka, 63, Zambian politician, chief opposition leader in Zambia.
Bernard Ostry, 78, Canadian chair and CEO of TVOntario, civil servant and philanthropist, cancer.
Claude Piéplu, 83, French actor, cancer.
John Wheeldon, 76, Australian federal politician, former Australian Labor Party Senator and minister in the Whitlam government.

25 

Sir Julian Bullard, 78, British diplomat.
Elizabeth Connelly, 77, American politician, former member of the New York State Assembly representing Staten Island, cancer.
Desmond Dekker, 64, Jamaican ska musician, heart attack.
Lars Gyllensten, 84, Swedish author, physician, and member of the Swedish Academy.
Wilber Huston, 93, American scientist and retired NASA mission director.
 Donald Rudolph, 85, US Army soldier awarded the Medal of Honor during World War II, Alzheimer's disease.
Mari Yonehara, 56, Japanese essayist, ovarian cancer.
Tobías Lasser, 95, Venezuelan botanist, founder of the Botanic Garden of Caracas, natural causes.

26 
Milicent Bagot, 99, British intelligence officer.
Horondino José da Silva aka "Dino Sete Cordas", 88, Brazilian virtuouso of the seven-string guitar.
Selvin González, 24, Salvadoran footballer.
Tuomo Kerola, 48, Finnish Olympic swimmer.
Alan Kotok, 64, American early video game designer (Spacewar!), engineer for Digital Equipment.
Carl Kuntze, 83, Dutch Olympic rower 
Mahmoud al-Majzoub aka Abu Hamza, 41, Palestinian Islamic Jihad leader, assassination by bombing.
Édouard Michelin, 42, French CEO of Michelin, boating accident off the Île de Sein.
Kevin O'Flanagan, 86, Irish former association football and rugby union international, and IOC member, heart problems.
Anita Roberts, 64, American molecular biologist at the National Cancer Institute, stomach cancer.
Ted Schroeder, 84, American tennis player, winner at Wimbledon (1949) and the U.S. Open (1942), cancer.
Raymond Triboulet, 99, French member of the French Resistance during World War II, member of the French Parliament and government minister.

27 
Adeeb, 72, Pakistani actor.
Harold Falls, 96, American ophthalmologist.
Paul Gleason, 67, American actor (The Breakfast Club), mesothelioma.
Craig "Ironhead" Heyward, 39, American NFL fullback, complications from a brain tumor.
Romeo Lucas García, 81, Guatemalan politician, former President of Guatemala, complications of Alzheimer's disease.
Thelma Leeds, 95, American actress, widow of Parkyakarkus.
Jim Mello, 85, American football player.
Michael Riffaterre, 81, French-born professor at Columbia University and scholar of French literature.
Alex Toth, 77, American comic book artist and cartoonist (Space Ghost, Birdman and the Galaxy Trio).
Apache Bull Ramos, 71, American professional wrestler, shoulder infection.

28 
Edward Aldwell, 68, American music theorist and pianist specializing in Bach, automotive accident.
James Archibald, 94, American Maine judge for 50 years, including service on the Maine Judicial Supreme Court between 1971 and his retirement in 1981.
Rupert Blöch, 76, Austrian Olympic sprinter.
Lewis Carter, 81, Australian cricketer.
Fermín Chávez, 82, Argentine historian, complications from renal failure.
Sue Fear, 43, Australian mountaineer, climbing accident.
Umberto Masetti, 80, Italian motorcycle racer, the first Italian World Champion class 500cc in 1950 and 1952, pulmonary strokes.
Masumi Okada, 70, Japanese actor, played Brother Michael in Shogun, throat cancer.
Tony Sardisco, 73, American footballer, former captain of the Boston Patriots, heart attack.
Doris Saunders, 64, Canadian magazine editor, Order of Canada inductee, Alzheimer's disease.
Arthur Widmer, 91, American motion picture special effects pioneer, winner of an Academy Award for Lifetime Achievement, cancer.

29 

Neville Amadio, 93, Australian flautist and soloist for Sydney Symphony for 50 years, series of small heart attacks.
Poul Andersen, 84, Danish-born publisher of Bien, the only weekly Danish newspaper in the US, Alzheimer's disease.
Clarence Bailey, 43, American football player.
Peter Borsari, 67, American-Swiss celebrity photographer, complications from elective knee surgery.
James Brolan, 42, British CBS News sound technician, injuries sustained in car bombing in Iraq.
Paul Douglas, 48, British veteran CBS News cameraman, injuries sustained in car bombing in Iraq.
Wyn Griffiths, 86, Welsh professional football player (Cardiff City F.C., Newport County A.F.C.), complications from a fall.
Steve Mizerak, 61, American champion billiards player.
Omeljan Pritsak, 87, Austrian-born American Harvard professor, scholar and authority on Ukraine.
Johnny Servoz-Gavin, 64, French racing driver.

30 

Slim Aarons, 89, American photographer, stroke.
Marius van Amelsvoort, 75, Dutch politician, State Secretary for Finance.
Hladnik Boštjan, 77, Slovenian film director.
Ann Harnett, 85, American baseball player (All-American Girls Professional Baseball League).
Shohei Imamura, 79, Japanese film director (Black Rain), two-time winner of the Palme d'Or, liver cancer.
Bill Kovacs, 56, American computer animation pioneer and Academy Award winner, complications of a stroke.
David Lloyd, 68, New Zealand botanist, complications from mystery illness, possibly poison.
Robert Sterling, 88, American film and television actor, star of 1950s television show Topper, natural causes.

31 
Miguel Berrocal, 73, Spanish sculptor and puzzle creator, prostate cancer.
Ronald Cranford, 65, American neurologist and bioethicist who developed coma standards, complications of kidney cancer. 
Raymond Davis Jr., 91, American chemist and a winner of the Nobel Prize in Physics in 2002, Alzheimer's disease.
Lula Mae Hardaway, 76, American songwriter, mother of singer Stevie Wonder, natural causes.

References

2006-05
 05